2-Aminotetralin (2-AT), also known as 1,2,3,4-tetrahydronaphthalen-2-amine (THN), is a stimulant drug with a chemical structure consisting of a tetralin group combined with an amine.

2-AT is a rigid analogue of phenylisobutylamine and fully substitutes for d-amphetamine in rat discrimination tests, although at one eighth the potency. It has been shown to inhibit the reuptake of serotonin and norepinephrine, and likely induces their release as well. It is also likely to act on dopamine on account of its full substitution of d-amphetamine in rodent studies.

Chemical derivatives 

A number of derivatives of 2-aminotetralin exist, including:

See also 
 2-Aminodilin
 2-Aminoindane

References 

Aminotetralins
Stimulants
Serotonin-norepinephrine-dopamine releasing agents